Christopher Paul Klieman (born September 27, 1967) is an American college football coach and former player. He is the head football coach at Kansas State University, a position he has held since the 2019 season. Klieman served as the head football coach at North Dakota State University from 2014 to 2018. He succeeded the retiring Bill Snyder at Kansas State after leading the North Dakota State Bison to four NCAA Division I Football Championship titles in five seasons.

Early life
Klieman was born on September 27, 1967, in Waterloo, Iowa to Robert "Bob" Klieman and Mary Kay. He was raised in Waterloo and graduated from Columbus Catholic High School in 1986. Through high school he was a star athlete, competing as quarterback and defensive back on the football team. His father Bob, a Hall of Fame official and a long time coach of both golf and football at Columbus Catholic High School, is also a member of the Upper Iowa University Athletic Hall of Fame. Klieman has two siblings, a sister, Sarah, and a brother, Scott.

After high school, Klieman attended the University of Northern Iowa where he played in the defensive secondary for the Panthers football team from 1986 to 1990.

Coaching career
After graduating from Northern Iowa in 1990, Klieman began coaching for the Panthers under then-head coach Terry Allen until 1993. Klieman accepted a position with Western Illinois and stayed there for 3 seasons until 1996. In 1997, he enjoyed a brief season stay with Kansas as a defensive backs coach and one season with Missouri State in 1999. He then spent five seasons at Loras College from 2001 to 2005, serving as defensive coordinator from 2002 to 2004. In 2005, he accepted his first head coaching position, leading the Division III Loras Duhawks to a 3–7 record. In early 2006, he stepped down from his head coaching position at Loras to accept the defensive backs coaching position back at his alma mater Northern Iowa. He became co-defensive coordinator the next year and held that position until leaving for North Dakota State in 2011.

North Dakota State
In 2011, Craig Bohl hired Klieman as a defensive backs coach. He became the defensive coordinator the following season in 2012 until being promoted in 2014. After Bohl announced that he was leaving to become the head coach of Wyoming, then athletic director Gene Taylor promoted Klieman to become the 30th head football coach in Bison history in 2014.

After winning three consecutive National Championships and going 43–2 since 2011, the expectations for the 2014 team were not high. The Bison had lost their starting quarterback and a total of 30 seniors that graduated before the season started. But 2014 surprised everyone when he and future 2nd overall NFL draft pick Carson Wentz led the Bison to a 15–1 overall record and a fourth consecutive national championship by beating Illinois State in a close, hard-fought championship game. NDSU became the first Division 1 football program to win four consecutive championships.

In 2015, the Bison continued their winning ways and ended the season 13–2 with a fifth consecutive national championship, the most by any NCAA football program in history.

In 2016, the Bison again won their conference title, but lost in the FCS semi-finals to James Madison, their first playoff loss in 6 years. They ended the year at 12–2, their sixth straight season with double-digit wins. The 2017 season continued the Bison dominance by again going 10–1 and winning their seventh consecutive MVFC title and avenging the previous years loss to James Madison by beating them in the Championship Game 17–13. It was Klieman's third National Championship in four seasons and the Bison's sixth in seven years. They won it all again in 2018.

Kansas State
On December 10, 2018, Kansas State University Athletic Director Gene Taylor announced Klieman had been hired as the program's 35th head coach to replace the recently retired Bill Snyder. Taylor, who promoted Klieman to head coach at NDSU, had recently been named athletic director at Kansas State. Klieman signed a six-year contract worth $16.8 million. Both schools agreed that Klieman would remain at NDSU while the Bison were participating in the FCS playoffs. On December 3, 2022, Kansas State defeated TCU in overtime 31 - 28 to win the Big 12 Championship.

Head coaching record

References

External links
 Kansas State profile
 North Dakota State profile

1967 births
Living people
American football defensive backs
Kansas Jayhawks football coaches
Kansas State Wildcats football coaches
Loras Duhawks football coaches
Missouri State Bears football coaches
North Dakota State Bison football coaches
Northern Iowa Panthers football coaches
Northern Iowa Panthers football players
Western Illinois Leathernecks football coaches
Sportspeople from Waterloo, Iowa
Coaches of American football from Iowa
Players of American football from Iowa